Tsunami 2265 is a video game developed by Italian studio Prograph Research.

Gameplay

Development
On July 9, 2002, Got Game announced that their game had gone gold.

Reception

Tsunami 2265 received negative reception by video game critics.

References

External links

2002 video games
Video games about mecha
Third-person shooters
Video games developed in Italy
Windows games
Windows-only games
Got Game Entertainment games
Single-player video games